The Toronto International Film Festival Award for Best Canadian Film is an annual juried film award, presented by the Toronto International Film Festival to a film judged to be the best Canadian feature film.

As with TIFF's other juried awards, the jury has the discretion to name one or more honorable mentions in addition to the overall winner, but are normally expected to name a single winner. On only one occasion to date, in 1997, were two full winners of the award named in the same year.

Since 2020, the award has been presented as one of three Amplify Voices awards rather than as a standalone category. The Amplify Voices awards are presented to three films overall, with one award open to all feature films made by Canadian directors and designated as the Amplify Voices Award for Best Canadian Film, while the other two awards are open to any feature films, regardless of nationality, directed by BIPOC filmmakers; however, all three awards are selected and presented by the same jury.

Winners
Films whose titles are highlighted in yellow were the winners of the award; non-highlighted films were given honorable mentions.

See also
Vancouver International Film Festival Award for Best Canadian Film

References

Best Canadian Film